The Avon Wilderness Park is a protected area in the southern part of the Victorian Alps, located in Australia.

Location and features
The reserve is contiguous with the southern border of the Alpine National Park and was declared in 1987. It protects  of mountain ash and sub-alpine woodlands. Although there are no walking or vehicle tracks inside the park, hiking is possible with the use of topographic maps. The nearest point of access is via Licola. Along with Big Desert Wilderness Park and Wabba Wilderness Park, it is one of three such parks in Victoria, managed by Parks Victoria.

On 7 November 2008 the park was added to the Australian National Heritage List as one of eleven areas constituting the Australian Alps National Parks and Reserves.

References

External links

Avon Wilderness Park, Parks Victoria

Wilderness parks of Victoria (Australia)
Australian National Heritage List
1987 establishments in Australia
Australian Alps National Parks and Reserves